Scanning The Greenhouse is the first compilation album by the Swedish progressive rock band The Flower Kings.

This album contains songs from their first four studio albums (including Roine Stolt's solo album The Flower King) and focuses on long tracks, almost all of them with more than ten minutes. It was released when the band was visiting the United States for the first time.

The album was released in Japan through Avalon Records with a cover version of the Genesis song "The Cinema Show", the band's original contribution to the Genesis tribute album The Fox Lies Down, in place of the song "Compassion".

Track listing
All songs by Roine Stolt except where noted.
 "In the Eyes of the World" – 10:38
 "World of Adventures" – 13:37
 "Pipes of Peace" (Tomas Bodin, Stolt) – 1:19
 "The Flower King" (1998 re-recorded version) – 11:40
 "There Is More to This World" – 10:15
 "Stardust We Are, Part 3" (1998 re-recorded version) – 9:56
 "Retropolis" – 11:10
 "Compassion" – 4:45

Personnel
 Roine Stolt – vocals, guitars, bass guitar, keyboards, percussion
 Tomas Bodin – keyboards, vocals
 Hasse Fröberg – vocals, guitars
 Michael Stolt – bass guitar, vocals
 Jaime Salazar – drums
 Hasse Bruniusson – drums, percussion

Production
 Lilian Forsberg – photography 
 Dexter Frank Jr. – engineer
 David Palermo – artwork

References

1998 compilation albums
The Flower Kings albums